George Augustus Bagley (July 22, 1826 – May 12, 1915) was an American politician and a United States representative from New York.

Biography
Born in Watertown, Jefferson County, Bagley received an academic training, studied law, was admitted to the bar in New York in 1847 and commenced practice in Watertown. He married Sabine Pauline and they had five children, one of whom died in infancy. The four surviving children were George, Ambrose C., Pauline Sabine, and Madeleine.

Career
Bagley continued the practice of his profession in Watertown until his retirement in 1853 to engage in the manufacture of iron. He was president of the village of Watertown in 1866, and town supervisor from 1865 to 1868.

Elected as a Republican, Bagley was U.S. Representative for the twenty-second district of New York to the Forty-fourth and Forty-fifth Congresses. He was in office from March 4, 1875, to March 3, 1879.  He resumed the manufacture of iron until his death in 1915.

Death
Bagley died on May 12, 1915. He is buried at Brookside Cemetery in Watertown.

References

External links

1826 births
1915 deaths
19th-century American politicians
Burials in New York (state)
New York (state) lawyers
Politicians from Watertown, New York
Republican Party members of the United States House of Representatives from New York (state)
19th-century American lawyers